The World According to Bush is a 2004 French documentary, co-written and directed by William Karel based on the book by Éric Laurent, about the presidency of George W. Bush and the history of the Bush family, including his grandfather Prescott Bush, who was on the board of German-owned companies during the Nazi period. The film  examines and interviews Bush supporters, including the Christian right, neo-conservatives, and businesspeople, as well as Bush critics and shows televised statements made by Bush and his supporters, including Jerry Falwell. It was nominated for the Best Documentary Award at the European Film Awards and was to have been an Official Selection for the 2004 Cannes Film Festival but was rejected following the selection of Michael Moore's Fahrenheit 9/11.

The film features interviews with (in order of appearance):

 Michael Ledeen
 David Frum
 Jim Hoagland, Washington Post
 Stanley Hoffmann, Harvard University
 Jerry Falwell
 James Robison
 Ed McAteer
 Arnaud de Borchgrave, Washington Post
 Robert David Steele, Central Intelligence Agency
 James Woolsey
 Richard Perle
 Robert Baer, Central Intelligence Agency
 Antony Blinken
 David Corn, The Nation
 Hans Blix
 Sam Gwynne, Texas Monthly
 Colin Powell
 Joseph Wilson
 Charles Lewis (journalist), Center for Public Integrity
 Viet Dinh
 Norman Mailer
 Frank Carlucci, Carlyle Group
 Laurent Murawiec, former analyst at Rand Corporation
 David Kay

References

External links
 
The World According to Bush on CBC
The World According to Bush on Flach Film

2004 films
Documentary films about American politicians
Films about George W. Bush
Cultural depictions of George W. Bush
French documentary films
2004 documentary films
Films directed by William Karel
2000s American films
2000s French films